X Stands for Unknown is a collection of seventeen nonfiction science essays written by Isaac Asimov. It was the seventeenth of a series of books collecting essays from The Magazine of Fantasy and Science Fiction, these being first published between January 1982 and May 1983. It was first published by Doubleday & Company in 1984.

Contents
Physics
1 Read Out Your Good Book in Verse (May 1982)
2 Four Hundred Octaves (June 1982)
3 The Three Who Died Too Soon (July 1982)
4 X Stands for Unknown (August 1982)
Chemistry
5 Big Brother (September 1982)
6 Bread and Stone (October 1982)
7 A Difference of an 'E' (November 1982)
8 Silicon Life After All (December 1982)
Astronomy
9 The Long Ellipse (January 1982)
10 Change of Time and State (April 1982)
11 Whatzisname's Orbit (March 1982)
12 Ready and Waiting (February 1983)
13 Dead Centre (April 1983)
14 Out in the Boondocks (May 1983)
Mathematics
15 To Ungild Refinèd Gold (January 1983)
16 The Circle of the Earth (February 1982)
17 The Armies of the Night (March 1983)

Reception
Dave Langford reviewed X Stands for Unknown for White Dwarf #79, and stated that "If you're scientifically literate you'll find the interesting bits buried in over-familiar stuff (though I always cheer Asimov when he stomps the crackpots). If not, you probably don't read books like this. That's showbiz."

Reviews
Review by Edward James (1985) in Paperback Inferno, #55

References

External links
Asimovonline.com
'X' Stands For Unknown at goodreads.com

Essay collections by Isaac Asimov
1984 books
Doubleday (publisher) books
Works originally published in The Magazine of Fantasy & Science Fiction